Henri Émile Hermand Malherbe, also known as Henry Malherbe or Henry Croisilles (4 February 1886 – 17 March 1958) was a French writer.

Life and career

Malherbe was born in Bucharest. In Paris he wrote for Le Temps, the magazine Excelsior, and later for La Revue des vivants, ("organe de la génération de la guerre"), of which he was co-director with Henry de Jouvenel.

Malherbe fought in the First World War. In 1953 the association established the Henry Malherbe Prize for essays in his honour.
In 1917 Malherbe won the Prix Goncourt for the novel La flamme au poing, (literally, "The Flame in the Fist", published in English translation in 1918 as The Flame that is France). In 1918 the reviewer in the magazine North American Review wrote:

Music
Malherbe took a particular interest in musical matters. His interview with Claude Debussy in 1911 is quoted extensively by the composer's biographer Léon Vallas; his criticisms of the Conservatoire de Paris for what he saw as its reactionary agenda and declining standards were reported in Britain and the US, in The Times and by Richard Aldrich, music critic of The New York Times. As a critic, Malherbe was less inclined than some of his colleagues to take new works at face value: he spotted, as many other critics did not, what he called "the heated eroticism" that lay below the seemingly "innocent neoclassical surface" of Francis Poulenc's 1924 ballet Les biches.

In his book about Bizet's Carmen, published in 1951, Malherbe offered what the journal Hommes et mondes called an analysis "of rare lucidity" of the origins, libretto and score of the opera, and presented hitherto unpublished information about the circumstances of the composer's early death; in this Malherbe raised the possibility that unhappy in love and in despair at "the conspiracy of critics who had condemned Carmen", Bizet may not have died of illness but had killed himself.

Malherbe's other books on music attracted some adverse comment from his contemporaries for his propensity to speculate about his subjects. His biography of Schubert (1949) was criticised in Music & Letters for "sketches circumstantially describing scenes for which we have not a shred of evidence. … M. Malherbe allows himself again and again to be carried away by his enthusiasm into writing bookstall fiction." His 1938 Richard Wagner révolutionnaire also suffered from some "rather fictitious" biography, according to the Revue De Musicologie.

Later years
Malherbes was appointed a Commandeur de la Légion d'Honneur in April 1953. He died in Paris in 1958, at the age of 72.

Works
 Paul Hervieu E. Sansot & cie, 1912
  
 Le Jugement dernier, Éditions de la Sirène, 1920
 La Rocque : un chef, des actes, des idées, suivi de documents sur les doctrines de la rénovation nationale Librairie Plon, 1934
 La passion de la Malibran, A. Michel, 1937
 Richard Wagner révolutionnaire A. Michel, 1938
 Aux États-Unis, printemps du monde, A. Michel, 1945
 Franz Schubert, son amour, ses amitiés, A. Michel, 1949
 Carmen Michel, 1951

English Translations

Notes, references and sources

Notes

References

Sources
 
 

1886 births
1958 deaths
20th-century French novelists
20th-century French male writers
French male novelists
Prix Goncourt winners
Romanian emigrants to France